FC Bashinformsvyaz-Dynamo Ufa was a Russian football club from Ufa that existed for the 2009 and 2010 seasons. During those seasons it played in the Russian Second Division (zone Ural-Povolzhye).

After the 2010 season the club was dissolved and FC Ufa was created. Also, in the past, Ufa has been represented by FC Neftyanik Ufa.

External links
 Official website

Sport in Ufa
Defunct football clubs in Russia
Association football clubs established in 2009
Association football clubs disestablished in 2010
2009 establishments in Russia
2010 disestablishments in Russia